Hönigsberg is surname of:
 David Hönigsberg (1959–2005), a South African classical composer, conductor and musicologist
 Margarete Hilferding, née Hönigsberg (1871–1942)
 Leo Hönigsberg, famous Croatian architect and co-owner of the architecture studio Hönigsberg & Deutsch
 Nicolae Hönigsberg, Romanian footballer

German-language surnames
Jewish surnames